Siphonodella is an extinct genus of conodonts.

Siphonodella banraiensis is from the Late Devonian of Thailand. Siphonodella nandongensis is from the Early Carboniferous of the Baping Formation in China.

Use in stratigraphy 
The Tournaisian, the oldest age of the Mississippian (also known as Lower Carboniferous) contains eight conodont biozones, two of which are characterized by Siphonodella species:
 the zone of Gnathodus typicus and Siphonodella isosticha
 the zone of Siphonodella quadruplicata and Patrognathus andersoni (upper zone of Patrognathus andersoni)

The GSSP Golden Spike for the Tournaisian is in La Serre, Montagne Noire, France with the first appearance of Siphonodella sulcata. In 2006 it was discovered that this GSSP has biostratigraphic problems.

References

External links 
 
 

Conodont genera
Carboniferous conodonts
Devonian conodonts
Tournaisian life
Late Devonian first appearances
Late Devonian animals
Mississippian extinctions